The Clark C. Fowler House near Tompkinsville, Kentucky is an I-house which was built in 1880.  It was listed on the National Register of Historic Places in 2001.

It is a two-story frame, central passage plan structure, with Queen Anne influence in details of dormers and its rear porch.  It was built to serve as a boardinghouse and is on a hillside overlooking the Cumberland River.  It is the only surviving dwelling in the riverside community of Martinsburg.

References

Houses on the National Register of Historic Places in Kentucky
Houses completed in 1880
National Register of Historic Places in Monroe County, Kentucky
1880 establishments in Kentucky
Queen Anne architecture in Kentucky
I-houses
Central-passage houses